Stjepan Vranješ (born 28 August 1971) is a retired Croatian footballer. His former clubs include NK Osijek and Maccabi Netanya.

Career
Vranješ played football for Croatian side NK Osijek before moving abroad to play for Israeli side Maccabi Netanya at the end of his career. He is Osijek's only player to lift a trophy, after captaining then in the 1999 Croatian Football Cup Final.

References

External links
Profile at Strukljeva.net

1971 births
Living people
Association football defenders
Yugoslav footballers
Croatian footballers
NK Osijek players
Maccabi Netanya F.C. players
Yugoslav First League players
Croatian Football League players
Israeli Premier League players
Croatian expatriate footballers
Expatriate footballers in Israel
Croatian expatriate sportspeople in Israel